Eldon Sharpe "Buck" Newton III (born July 5, 1968) is an American lawyer and politician who formerly served as a Republican state senator in the North Carolina General Assembly (the state's legislature) representing N.C. District 11 (Wilson and Nash counties). Newton won his seat in the 2010 election by defeating the Democratic incumbent, Albin B. Swindell.

In 2016 Newton was the Republican nominee for North Carolina Attorney General losing to Democrat Josh Stein by 25,000 votes, a 0.5% margin.

Early life and education
A native of Wilson, North Carolina, Newton graduated from Hunt High School before attending Appalachian State University.  At A.S.U. he received his bachelor's degree in political science.

After college, Newton served as an aide to Senator Jesse Helms on the Foreign Relations Committee in the U.S. Senate.

Newton is also a graduate of the Campbell University School of Law. He has practiced law for 16 years at his firm, Newton and Lee, in Wilson, and became a state legislator in 2010.

State office
From 2007 to 2011, Newton served as the chairman for the Wilson County Republican Party before taking office in the state capital in early 2011, replacing State Senator Albin B. Swindell.

In response to the state's law on LGBT issues Newton, at a conservative rally supporting the North Carolina's House Bill 2 (a.k.a. "HB2"), said “Go home, tell your friends and family who had to work today what this is all about and how hard we must fight to keep our state straight.”  In a later interview, Newton said his remarks at the rally were intended to mean “keep men out of the ladies’ room.”  Newton has also said that "folks that wave the rainbow flags” need to get used to “the way things have always been in this state.” 

Newton ran for the state office of attorney general in 2016 as the official Republican Party nominee. But that November, he lost to Josh Stein, the Democratic nominee.

References

External links
North Carolina General Assembly - Senator E. S. (Buck) Newton (Rep)

Republican Party North Carolina state senators
Campbell University alumni
Appalachian State University alumni
People from Wilson, North Carolina
Living people
1968 births
21st-century American politicians